"Parade" is a song performed by American recording artist Dev, produced by NanosauR. It was written by Dev herself and chosen as a single extracted from her EP Bittersweet July Pt. 2 after being acclaimed by the fans. The song was released on the radios and on VEVO on March 24, 2015. "Parade" is an electropop rapped song which has been compared to Dev's previous hits like Bass Down Low, Fireball and In My Trunk. The official video was directed by photographer Aris Jerome.

Dev performed live the song at #DDICL before a football match the day of its release  along with her previous single Honey Dip and her hit In The Dark, as well as on her Bittersweet July tour.

Composition
"Parade" is the third track on the second part of Dev's Bittersweet July collection. The song starts with catchy high-drum beat and suggestive howls interspersed with the expression "Like you're welcome" and followed by the rapped chorus broken by the "Heeyyy", while the instrumental here shows for the first time prolonged bass similar which have been compared by the critics to her featured-in-single Like A G6. The verses and the bridge of the song are sung with Dev's typical talking style. The official bpm of the song is 110.

Music video
The music video for "Parade" was directed by Aris Jerome, who in the same period has also made a maritime photoshoot for Selena Gomez that became popular in a few days. The video is ambientend in the Arizona desert. Described as funky, the video starts with a gathering of friends led by Dev walking on the road and driving a convertible. While Dev is carrying in her womb a lilac-dyed dog, three female hip-hop dancers (among which Dev's sister) start to dance on the music with a twerkish choreography. The video also includes frames of girls holding burning firecrackers and white balloons, Dev's dad driving an old cadillac and the producer NanosauR.

Critical reception
Dieke magazine done a positive review of the song saying that "you can either love or hate Dev's music, but we happen to be on the love side" and calling it a "fun and track that mixes sassy vocals with a dope beat".
On the other side, several critics accused the music video of animal abuse, and defined the simplicity and univocity of the video a bit cheesy and disappointing.

References

Dev (singer) songs
2014 songs
2015 singles
Songs written by Dev (singer)